Charlie Baleña (born 1 June 1972) is a Filipino boxer. He competed in the men's featherweight event at the 1992 Summer Olympics.

References

1972 births
Living people
Filipino male boxers
Olympic boxers of the Philippines
Boxers at the 1992 Summer Olympics
Place of birth missing (living people)
Featherweight boxers